CS Santosh (siːɛs sʌnðəʊsh) (born 1 December 1983) is an Indian off-road and enduro motorcycle racer. His full name is Chunchunguppe Shivashankar Santosh. He is a multiple National Supercross and Motocross champion. CS Santosh has spent more than a decade racing motorbikes across challenging terrains and multiple nations. He is a rider who is under the banner of Hero MotoSports, and has spearheaded a rally revolution of sorts in India. Santosh has also given fresh hope to fellow talented riders that they too can make the step up to the global rally level.

Early life
While growing up, Santosh was always fascinated by adventure and that fascination continues to this day. At the age of 17, he watched his first Supercross race in Bangalore and read about the champion, Vijay Kumar, in newspapers the next day. Since then, he was motivated to become the best off-road racer that the country has ever had.

In a country where aspiring for a full-time career in motorsports is still in a very nascent stage, Santosh has shown the way by becoming the first Indian to participate and complete the Dakar rally.

Career
Santosh is India's most-accomplished rally-raid rider as he has taken part in Dakar Rally for six straight years and completed it thrice. His humble demeanour might not state it, but the trophy cabinet at this home speaks volumes about his accomplishments. There is barely a title or an accolade in the Indian motorsport scene that he has not won. CS, with his persistence, courage and determination has moulded himself perfectly in the sport of motocross.

Few men dream of the enigma that is the Dakar, few find the gall to take it up, and fewer still manage to complete it and still look like they've just come out of the library after an hour-long reading session. As for CS himself, things come full circle.

2005 
CS Santosh won the MRF National Supercross champion and the Gulf National Dirt Track championship in 2005 at the age of 22.

2006 
In 2006, he won the Al-Ain Motocross in Dubai & finished 5th overall in Dubai National MX championship.

2007 
He became the National Supercross champion after a successful year.

2008 
Thereafter in 2008, he became the first Indian in the Asian Motocross championship, to have qualified with the fastest time in Moto II in Iran, where he finished fourth, the highest ever by an Indian rider on the international circuit. He also became the MRF Supercross Challenge champion and won the Gulf Dirt Track championship for the second time.

2009 
Santosh won the 2009 Maharagama Motocross in Sri Lanka.

2010 
2010 was a successful year for Santosh as he won MRF National Supercross championship, the Rolon National Dirt Track championship as well as finishing 6th overall in the Asian MX championship. He also secured a Foxhill Supercross win in Sri Lanka later that year.

2011 
Santosh won the Gajaba Supercross as well as the Gunner's Supercross. Both held in Sri Lanka. He also won the Sigiri Rally Supercross and finished an impressive 2nd in the Fox Hill Supercross of 2011.

2012 
In 2012, he participated in the Raid-de-Himalaya, which is the only Indian motorsport event listed on the off-road rallies calendar of FIM (Federation Internationale Motorcyclisme), Geneva, Switzerland. He won the race in his maiden attempt in record time. It ranks among the top ten toughest motorsport rallies in the world and was a milestone in his racing career. He also finished 2nd in the Cavalry Supercross.

2013 
Santosh became the first Indian to debut at the World Cross Country Rally Championship in 2013 but an unfortunate fire accident injured him badly during the 3rd stage. He was running in the top 10 in his class. With third degree burns, he had a long recovery period that lasted till the end of the year.

2014 
Santosh took 2014 by storm and started it off by winning the Maruti Suzuki Desert Storm in India. Again, in his maiden attempt. This was a 2200 km long rally spread over six days, making it India's longest off-road motorsport annual event that traversed through the scorching deserts of Rajasthan. He also finished 9th in the 2014 World Cross Country Championship.

2015 
The Dakar Rally being the world's toughest off-road motorsport event, is very selective about their participants. One has to earn an invite to get an opportunity to take the challenge. CS Santosh became the first Indian to compete in the history of this magnanimous motorsport event. He finished the Dakar at 36th position, the two weeks at the Dakar were the hardest two weeks of his life physically, mentally and emotionally. He also won the 2015 Maruti Suzuki Desert Storm and finished 13th in the Baja Aragon.

2016 
Santosh returned to the Dakar in 2016 with Team Suzuki Rally, Spain and was determined to improve drastically. However, things didn't really go as planned as he had to retire from the race due to mechanical difficulties. He won the 2016 India Baja later that year and headed for the Desert Storm which he won for the third time in a row.

2017 
Santosh started off the year as the only Indian rider to finish the 2017 Dakar, while racing for Hero Speedbrain. He completed the race clocking a time of 41:20:37 at 47th position.

Santosh raced at the inaugural Nexa P1 Powerboat Indian Grand Prix of the Seas and took his maiden powerboat win. He was the first Indian P1 pilot to win the Nexa P1 Powerboat Indian Gran Prix of the Seas.

2018 
Santosh finished the 2018 Dakar Rally to become the first Indian to complete the rally raid thrice. His 34th position in the bike category was his best-ever finish at the Dakar.

2021 
Riding for the Hero Motocorp team in the Dakar 2021 rally, CS Santosh crashed out 135 km into the Stage 4 on a gravel track forcing his retirement. Suffering a suspected head injury, he was flown out to a hospital in Riyadh. On what was his seventh attempt at the fabled Dakar Rally, Santosh suffered a heavy crash on a gravel track in Stage 4. Husqvarna’s Paul Spierings was the first to arrive at the scene and revealed that he found Santosh unconscious and had to resuscitate him. After being attended to by the on-ground medical team, he was flown down to the German Hospital in Riyadh.

Awards and recognition
 Motorsport Man of the Year - 2015 
 FMSCI's Motorsport Man of the Year award - 2016

References

External links
 http://www.cssantosh.com/

1983 births
Living people
Indian motorsport people
Off-road racing drivers
Dakar Rally motorcyclists